Shirley Olivia Mills (April 8, 1926 – March 31, 2010) was an American actress. She played the roles of the youngest daughter in The Grapes of Wrath and the title character in Child Bride. In the latter, she is shown nude in a nude swimming scene, filmed when she was about 12 years old, which became the basis for Child Bride being classified for many years as an exploitation film.

Biography
Born in Tacoma, Washington, Mills started her career as a child dancer, and later appeared in films such as Child Bride (1938) at the age of 12,  The Grapes of Wrath (1940), and the Shirley Temple film Young People (1940). 

She stopped making films in her early twenties but was later a pioneer in selling data-processing services in the 1960s, becoming the first female president of the Data Processing Management Association in Los Angeles and later vice president of marketing and public relations for Management Applied Programming, a major data processing center, for which she started a division for nonprofit organizations.
Hanson also launched her own wedding planning company, A Party for All Seasons.

Mills married Mel Hanson, a minister, in 1977 who died in 1994; they had no children.

Mills died in Arcadia, California, on March 31,  2010, eight days before her 84th birthday, from complications of pneumonia.

Filmography

Notes

References

Bibliography

External links
 
 
  Classic Movie Kids

1926 births
2010 deaths
20th-century American actresses
American film actresses
American child actresses
American female dancers
American dancers
American television actresses
Actresses from Tacoma, Washington
Burials at Forest Lawn Memorial Park (Hollywood Hills)
Deaths from pneumonia in California
21st-century American women